Gopal Singh Qaumi (1897-1975) was an active member of the Gurdwara Reform Movement. He served as the President of the Shiromani Gurdwara Prabandhak Committee just for one day, until now the shortest serving President. He remained in confinement for 13 years during the freedom struggle. He took an active part in the Simon Commission boycott, the Quit India movement, Guru Ka Bagh Morcha and went for 64 days hunger strike in jail. He was awarded the Tamra Patra award by the Government of India on 15 August 1975. He also remained the President of Shiromani Akali Dal.

References

1897 births
1975 deaths